The 1969 Daytona 500 was a NASCAR Grand National Series race held on February 23, 1969, at Daytona International Speedway in Daytona Beach, Florida.

Background

Daytona International Speedway is a race track in Daytona Beach, Florida, that is one of six superspeedways to hold NASCAR races, the others being Michigan International Speedway, Auto Club Speedway, Indianapolis Motor Speedway, Pocono Raceway and Talladega Superspeedway. The track also features two other layouts that utilize portions of the primary high speed tri-oval, such as a  sports car course and a  motorcycle course. The track's  infield includes the  Lake Lloyd, which has hosted powerboat racing. The speedway is owned and operated by International Speedway Corporation.

The track was built by NASCAR founder Bill France, Sr. to host racing that was being held at the former Daytona Beach Road Course and opened with the first Daytona 500 in 1959. The speedway has been renovated three times, with the infield renovated in 2004, and the track repaved in 1978 and 2010.

The Daytona 500 is regarded as the most important and prestigious race on the NASCAR calendar. It is also the series' first race of the year; this phenomenon is virtually unique in sports, which tend to have championships or other major events at the end of the season rather than the start. Since 1995, U.S. television ratings for the Daytona 500 have been the highest for any auto race of the year, surpassing the traditional leader, the Indianapolis 500 which in turn greatly surpasses the Daytona 500 in in-track attendance and international viewing. The 2006 Daytona 500 attracted the sixth largest average live global TV audience of any sporting event that year with 20 million viewers.

Race report

LeeRoy Yarbrough chased down Charlie Glotzbach, who had an 11-second lead, and passed him on the final lap after starting 19th. It was the first Daytona 500 won on a last lap pass. Yarbrough won in a back-up Ford car after crashing his primary one. This would also be the second-last Daytona 500 before the NASCAR Grand National Series became the Winston Cup Series in 1971. Starting in 1971, all races were to have 43 competitors maximum in a starting grid starting with the 1971 Daytona 500.

First Daytona 500 starts for Benny Parsons, Ray Elder, Vic Elford, Richard Brickhouse, Cecil Gordon, Dick Brooks, Ben Arnold, J. D. McDuffie, and Pete Hamilton. Only Daytona 500 start for George Bauer, E. J. Trivette, Swede Savage, Bobby Unser, Bill Kimmel, Billy Taylor, and Dick Poling. Last Daytona 500 starts for Andy Hampton, Dub Simpson, Wayne Smith, Earl Brooks, Dick Johnson, Bobby Johns, Paul Goldsmith, and H. B. Bailey.

Top 10 finishers

Timeline
Section reference: 
 Start of race: Buddy Baker had the pole position, so he led the other cars into the start of lap 1.
 Lap 4: Cale Yarborough took over the lead from Buddy Baker before losing it to Buddy Baker on lap 21.
 Lap 9: Roy Mayne had engine problems in his vehicle so he wasn't able to finish the race.
 Lap 19: Dick Poling's vehicle suddenly had engine problems that knocked him out of the event.
 Lap 20: Billy Taylor would finish in an abysmal 48th place due to a faulty engine.
 Lap 21: Buddy Baker took over the lead from Cale Yarborough.
 Lap 24: H.B. Bailey would see his day on the track cut short due to engine issues.
 Lap 30: Bill Kimmel would be put on the sidelines due to engine problems with his vehicle.
 Lap 34: Donnie Allison took over the lead from Buddy Baker before losing it to Buddy Baker on lap 46.
 Lap 41: Johnny Sears managed to overheat his vehicle.
 Lap 44: Pete Hamilton had a terminal crash, forcing him out of the race prematurely.
 Lap 45: Bobby Allison's vehicle developed a faulty engine which caused him to finish in a despicable 43rd place.
 Lap 47: Bobby Unser took over the lead from Buddy Baker before losing it back to Buddy Baker on lap 48.
 Lap 56: A.J. Foyt took over the lead from Buddy Baker; Bobby Unser had a terminal crash while racing at high speeds.
 Lap 57: Donnie Allison took over the lead from A.J. Foyt, ultimately losing it to Charlie Glotzbach on lap 119.
 Lap 62: Paul Goldsmith had a terminal crash, forcing him to be sidelined for the remainder of the event.
 Lap 67: Bobby Johns managed to overheat his vehicle.
 Lap 87: J.D. McDuffie fell out with engine failure while racing at competitive speeds.
 Lap 103: Cale Yarborough had a terminal crash, forcing him to accept a miserable 38th place.
 Lap 104: Dick Johnson had an oil leak in his vehicle, rendering his vehicle unsafe to drive in.
 Lap 119: Charlie Glotzbach took over the lead from Donnie Allison.
 Lap 123: Swede Savage had a terminal crash that would knock him out of the race.
 Lap 130: Earl Brooks managed to overheat his vehicle from the trials and tribulations of high-speed driving.
 Lap 133: Ben Arnold's engine could not take any more racing and developed problems.
 Lap 139: Donnie Allison took over the lead from Charlie Glotzbach.
 Lap 140: Dick Brooks' engine had seen better moments of the race and stopped working completely.
 Lap 146: Charlie Glotzback took over the lead from Donnie Allison.
 Lap 150: Bobby Isaac had a terminal crash.
 Lap 153: Ben Arnold's vehicle would release a dangerous amount of debris, ending full-speed racing until lap 157.
 Lap 155: Donnie Allison took over the lead from Charlie Glotzbach.
 Lap 161: LeeRoy Yarbrough took over the lead from Donnie Allison.
 Lap 170: Buddy Harrington fell out with engine failure.
 Lap 178: Charlie Glotzbach took over the lead from LeeRoy Yarbrough.
 Lap 200: LeeRoy Yarbrough took over the lead from Charlie Glotzbach.
 Finish: LeeRoy Yarbrough was officially declared the winner of the event.

References

Daytona 500
Daytona 500
NASCAR races at Daytona International Speedway
Daytona 500